Santon is a depopulated village located near Santon Downham in Norfolk, England. Moated earthworks and other remains of the medieval village are a scheduled monument.

The villages name means 'Sandy farm/settlement'.

The village church of All Saints' was rebuilt from ruins in the 17th century by Thomas Bancrofte, the sole parishioner at that time.

The site is adjacent to the Forestry Commission's St Helen's picnic site.

References

http://kepn.nottingham.ac.uk/map/place/Norfolk/Santon

Villages in Norfolk
Scheduled monuments in Norfolk
Breckland District